Pyrex (trademarked as PYREX and pyrex) is a brand introduced by Corning Inc. in 1915 for a line of clear, low-thermal-expansion borosilicate glass used for laboratory glassware and kitchenware. It was later expanded to include kitchenware products made of soda-lime glass and other materials.

In 1998, the kitchenware division of Corning Inc. responsible for the development of Pyrex spun off from its parent company as Corning Consumer Products Company, subsequently renamed Corelle Brands (and would later merge with Instant Brands). Corning Inc. no longer manufactures or markets consumer products, only industrial ones.

Both trademarks, PYREX (all uppercase) and pyrex (all lowercase, introduced in 1975), were used interchangeably in the marketing of kitchenware products made of both borosilicate and soda lime glass, in addition to related accessories, for several decades. The latter trademark is now used for kitchenware sold in the United States, South America, and Asia. In Europe, Africa, and the Middle East, a variation of the PYREX (all uppercase) trademark is licensed by International Cookware for bakeware that has been made of numerous materials including borosilicate and soda-lime glass, stoneware, metal, plus vitroceramic cookware.

In the past, the brand name has also been used for kitchen utensils and bakeware by other companies in regions such as Japan and Australia.

History 

Borosilicate glass was first made by German chemist and glass technologist Otto Schott, founder of Schott AG in 1893, 22 years before Corning produced the Pyrex brand. Schott AG sells the product under the name "Duran".

In 1908, Eugene Sullivan, director of research at Corning Glass Works, developed Nonex, a borosilicate low-expansion glass, to reduce breakage in shock-resistant lantern globes and battery jars. Sullivan had learned about Schott's borosilicate glass as a doctoral student in Leipzig, Germany. Jesse Littleton of Corning discovered the cooking potential of borosilicate glass by giving his wife Bessie Littleton a casserole dish made from a cut-down Nonex battery jar. Corning removed the lead from Nonex and developed it as a consumer product. Pyrex made its public debut in 1915 during World War I, positioned as an American-produced alternative to Duran.

A Corning executive gave the following account of the etymology of the name "Pyrex":

Corning purchased the Macbeth-Evans Glass company in 1936 and their Charleroi, PA plant was used to produce Pyrex opal ware bowls and bakeware made of tempered soda-lime glass. In 1958 an internal design department was started by John B. Ward. He redesigned the Pyrex ovenware and Flameware. Over the years, designers such as Penny Sparke, Betty Baugh, Smart Design, TEAMS Design, and others have contributed to the design of the line.

Corning divested itself of the Corning Consumer Products Company (now known as Corelle Brands) in 1998 and production of consumer Pyrex products went with it. Its previous licensing of the name to Newell Cookware Europe remained in effect. France-based cookware maker Arc International acquired Newell's European business in early 2006 to own rights to the brand in Europe, the Middle East and Africa. In 2007, Arc closed the Pyrex soda-lime factory in Sunderland moving all European production to France. The Sunderland factory had first started making Pyrex in 1922. In 2014, Arc International sold off its Arc International Cookware division which operated the Pyrex business to Aurora Capital for its Resurgence Fund II. The division was renamed the International Cookware group. London-based private equity firm Kartesia purchased International Cookware in 2020. In 2021, Pyrex rival Duralex was acquired by International Cookware group for €3.5 million (US$4.2m).

Composition 

Older clear-glass Pyrex manufactured by Corning, Arc International's Pyrex products, and Pyrex laboratory glassware are made of borosilicate glass. According to the National Institute of Standards and Technology, borosilicate Pyrex is composed of (as percentage of weight): 4.0% boron, 54.0% oxygen, 2.8% sodium, 1.1% aluminum, 37.7% silicon, and 0.3% potassium.

According to glass supplier Pulles and Hannique, borosilicate Pyrex is made of Corning 7740 glass and is equivalent in formulation to Schott Glass 8330 glass sold under the "Duran" brand name. The composition of both Corning 7740 and Schott 8330 is given as 80.6% , 12.6% , 4.2% , 2.2% , 0.1% , 0.1% , 0.05% , and 0.04% .

In the late 1930s and 1940s, Corning also introduced new product lines under the Pyrex brand using different types of glass. Opaque tempered soda-lime glass was used to create decorated opal ware bowls and bakeware and aluminosilicate glass was used for Pyrex Flameware stovetop cookware. The latter product had a bluish tint caused by the addition of alumino-sulfate.

Beginning in the 1980s, production of clear Pyrex glass products manufactured by Corning (and later Instant Brands, after the consumer division was spun off and renamed) was also shifted to tempered soda-lime glass, like their popular opal bakeware. This change was justified by stating that soda-lime glass has higher mechanical strength than borosilicatemaking it more resistant to physical damage when dropped, which is believed to be the most common cause of breakage in glass bakeware. The glass is also cheaper to produce and more environmentally friendly.  However, its thermal shock resistance is lower than borosilicate's, leading to potential breakage from heat stress if used contrary to recommendations. Since the closure of the soda-lime plant in England in 2007, European Pyrex has been made solely from borosilicate.

The differences between Pyrex-branded glass products has also led to controversy regarding safety issuesin 2008, the U.S. Consumer Product Safety Commission reported it had received 66 complaints by users reporting that their Pyrex glassware had shattered over the prior ten years yet concluded that Pyrex glass bakeware does not present a safety concern. The consumer affairs magazine Consumer Reports investigated the issue and released test results, in January 2011, confirming that borosilicate glass bakeware was less susceptible to thermal shock breakage than tempered soda lime bakeware. However, they admitted their testing conditions were "contrary to instructions" provided by the manufacturer. STATS analyzed the data available and found that the most common way that users were injured by glassware was via mechanical breakage, being hit or dropped, and that "the change to soda lime represents a greater net safety benefit."

Use in telescopes 

Because of its low expansion characteristics, Pyrex borosilicate glass is often the material of choice for reflective optics in astronomy applications.

In 1932, George Ellery Hale approached Corning with the challenge of fabricating the  telescope mirror for the California Institute of Technology's Palomar Observatory project. A previous effort to fabricate the optic from fused quartz had failed, with the cast blank having voids. The mirror was cast by Corning during 1934–1936 out of borosilicate glass. After a year of cooling, during which it was almost lost to a flood, the blank was completed in 1935. The first blank now resides in the Corning Museum of Glass.

See also
 Jena glass

References

Sources
 
 Gantz, Carroll, (2001). DESIGN CHRONICLES: Significant Mass-produced Products of the 20th Century, Schiffer Publishing,

External links 

 Official Pyrex website
 Vintage Pyrex Reference Guide

Glass trademarks and brands
Kitchenware brands
Low-expansion glass
Transparent materials
Products introduced in 1915
American brands
Boron compounds
Corning Inc.
Kitchenware

it:Vetro borosilicato